Stasys Baranauskas (born 7 May 1962) is a Lithuanian retired football midfielder who last played for Kareda Siauliai during his professional career. He obtained 14 caps for the Lithuania national football team, scoring one goal.

References

hapoel petach tikva profile 

1962 births
Living people
Soviet footballers
Lithuanian footballers
Lithuania international footballers
Lithuanian expatriate footballers
Expatriate footballers in Austria
Expatriate footballers in Israel
Soviet Top League players
FK Žalgiris players
FK Ekranas players
First Vienna FC players
Hapoel Petah Tikva F.C. players
FK Kareda Kaunas players
Sportspeople from Kaunas
Soviet expatriate footballers
Soviet expatriate sportspeople in Israel
Lithuanian expatriate sportspeople in Austria
Association football midfielders